Notogramma azapae is a species of ulidiid or picture-winged fly in the genus Notogramma of the family Ulidiidae.

References

Ulidiidae